Piet Stam (20 February 1919 – 5 July 1996) was a Dutch freestyle swimmer. He competed in two events at the 1936 Summer Olympics.

References

External links
 

1919 births
1996 deaths
Dutch male freestyle swimmers
Olympic swimmers of the Netherlands
Swimmers at the 1936 Summer Olympics
Sportspeople from East Java
20th-century Dutch people